Grant Hochstein  (born July 16, 1990) is an American former figure skater. He is the 2016 CS Nebelhorn Trophy bronze medalist and a two-time U.S. national pewter medalist (2016, 2017). He has finished in the top ten at three ISU Championships, including the 2016 World Championships.

Personal life 
Hochstein was born on July 16, 1990 in Warren, Michigan. After high school, he began studying history at Wayne State University in Detroit, but paused his studies in 2012 when he moved to California. He works as a coach in addition to competing. 

On April 5, 2016, he announced his engagement to fellow figure skater Caroline Zhang. They were married on August 18, 2018.

On April 19, 2021, Zhang gave birth to a daughter, Charlotte Grace Hochstein.

Career 
Hochstein won the pewter medal (fourth place) on the junior level at the 2009 U.S. Championships.

His ISU Junior Grand Prix debut came in the 2009–2010 season. Hochstein won silver in Budapest and placed fourth in Dresden, earning qualification to the ISU Junior Grand Prix Final, where he placed 5th. After finishing 7th on the senior level at the 2010 U.S. Championships, he was assigned to the 2010 World Junior Championships in The Hague, Netherlands. He placed first in the short program, 7th in the free skate, and 5th overall.

In 2010–2011, Hochstein was invited to the 2010 Skate Canada International and finished 10th in his first Grand Prix appearance. He was 12th at the 2011 and 2012 U.S. Championships. Peter Oppegard and Karen Kwan-Oppegard became his coaches in 2012, after Hochstein's move to California. He placed 15th at the 2013 U.S. Championships, 11th in 2014, and 9th in 2015.

In the 2015–2016 season, Hochstein was invited to two Grand Prix events, the 2015 Cup of China and 2015 NHK Trophy, and finished fourth at both. At the 2016 U.S. Championships, he was awarded the pewter medal after placing 6th in the short program, 4th in the free skate, and 4th overall. After the event, he was named in the U.S. team to the 2016 Four Continents, and a week later, he was added to the World Championships, replacing the injured Nathan Chen. Ranked 6th in the short and 10th in the free, Hochstein finished 8th overall at Four Continents in Taipei. At Worlds in Boston, he placed 16th in the short, 9th in the free, and 10th overall.

On August 3, 2018, U.S. Figure Skating announced Hochstein's retirement from competitive skating.

Programs

Competitive highlights 
GP: Grand Prix; CS: Challenger Series; JGP: Junior Grand Prix

2010–2011 to 2017–2018

2004–2005 to 2009–2010

Detailed results 
Small medals for short and free programs awarded only at ISU Championships.

References

External links 

 

American male single skaters
Living people
1990 births
Sportspeople from Warren, Michigan